Aigües is a municipality in the comarca of Alacantí in the Valencian Community, Spain.

References

Municipalities in the Province of Alicante
Alacantí